Zviad Sturua (born 25 April 1978) is a retired Georgian international footballer. He was a goalkeeper.

In February 2005, he joined FC Lokomotivi Tbilisi. In summer 2005, he moved to FC Dinamo Tbilisi.

References

External links

eufo.de

Footballers from Georgia (country)
Georgia (country) international footballers
FC Dinamo Tbilisi players
Association football goalkeepers
1978 births
Living people
FC Dinamo Batumi players
FC Samtredia players
FC Torpedo Kutaisi players
FC WIT Georgia players
FC Lokomotivi Tbilisi players
FC Chikhura Sachkhere players
FC Sioni Bolnisi players
FC Metalurgi Rustavi players
FC Gagra players
FC Kolkheti-1913 Poti players